Gornji Lukavac may refer to the following places:

 Gornji Lukavac, Gradačac
 Gornji Lukavac, Nevesinje

See also
 Lukavac Gornji, Bosnia and Herzegovina